The 1991–92 Howard Bison men's basketball team represented Howard University in the 1991–92 NCAA Division I men's basketball season. The Bison, led by second-year head coach Butch Beard, played their home games at Burr Gymnasium in Washington, D.C. as members of the Mid-Eastern Athletic Conference. They finished the season 17–14, 12–4 in MEAC play to win the conference regular season title. Howard followed that success by winning the MEAC tournament to earn an automatic bid to the NCAA tournament. As the No. 16 seed in the Midwest Region, the Bison were defeated by No. 1 seed Kansas in the opening round, 100–67.

Roster

Schedule and results 

|-
!colspan=12 style=| Regular season

|-
!colspan=12 style=| MEAC tournament

|-
!colspan=12 style=| NCAA tournament

|-

Source

References

Howard Bison men's basketball seasons
Howard Bison
Howard Bison men's basketball
Howard Bison men's basketball
Howard Bison